Aderbar Melo dos Santos Neto (born 17 March 1990), commonly known as Aderbar Santos or just Santos, is a Brazilian professional footballer who plays as a goalkeeper for Campeonato Brasileiro Série A club Flamengo.

Club career

Athletico Paranaense
Born in Campina Grande, Paraíba, Santos joined Athletico Paranaense's youth setup in 2008, aged 18. He was promoted to the main squad in 2010, as a fourth-choice.

Santos made his professional debut on 17 November 2012, starting in a 0–0 away draw against Criciúma, for the Série B championship. In 2013, he was promoted to second-choice, only behind Wéverton.

A starter during the year's Campeonato Paranaense (which Furacão only used under-23 players), Santos made his Série A debut on 20 October 2013, replacing injured Weverton in a 0–3 away loss against Goiás.

Santos remained as a backup to Weverton in the following seasons. In 2018, as the latter departed to Palmeiras, he became an undisputed starter. On 18 April of that year, he extended his contract until October 2020.

Flamengo
On 3 April 2022, Flamengo announced the signing of Santos on a contract until December 2025.

International career
On 19 September 2019, after lifting the 2019 Copa do Brasil, Santos was called up to the Brazil national team by manager Tite for two friendlies against Senegal and Nigeria, in October.

On 17 June 2021, Santos was named in the Brazil squad for the 2020 Summer Olympics.

Career statistics

Honours
Athletico Paranaense
 Copa Sudamericana: 2018, 2021
 J.League Cup / Copa Sudamericana Championship: 2019
 Copa do Brasil: 2019
 Campeonato Paranaense: 2016, 2018, 2020

Flamengo
 Copa Libertadores: 2022
 Copa do Brasil: 2022

Brazil Olympic
Summer Olympics: 2020

Individual
 Campeonato Brasileiro Série A Team of the Year: 2019
 Campeonato Brasileiro Série A most clean sheets: 2018
 Copa Libertadores Team of the Tournament: 2022

References

External links
 Santos at Atlético Paranaense  (archived)
 
 
 

1990 births
Living people
People from Campina Grande
Brazilian footballers
Association football goalkeepers
Campeonato Brasileiro Série A players
Campeonato Brasileiro Série B players
Club Athletico Paranaense players
CR Flamengo footballers
Copa Libertadores-winning players
Olympic footballers of Brazil
Footballers at the 2020 Summer Olympics
Olympic medalists in football
Olympic gold medalists for Brazil
Medalists at the 2020 Summer Olympics
Sportspeople from Paraíba